The KA Commuter line Tanah Abang–Rangkasbitung or the Rangkasbitung line is a commuter rail line in Indonesia, operated by PT Kereta Commuter Indonesia (KCI). The line connects Tanah Abang station in Central Jakarta and Rangkasbitung station in Lebak Regency, Banten. On maps and diagrams, the line is shown using the color "green". Tanah Abang–Rangkasbitung line is the longest and fourth busiest line in the KRL Commuterline system.

History 
The line is part of Tanah Abang–Rangkasbitung line, built by the Dutch Public Works Bureau (Burgerlijke Openbare Werken/BOW, now Ministry of Public Works) by decree of the Governor General as stipulated in the State Gazette (Staatsblad) No. 180 dated July 15, 1896. BOW constructed Batavia Zuid–Duri line with branches to Tangerang and Rangkasbitung–Anyer Kidul. The line between Tanah Abang and Rangkasbitung was formally opened on 1 October 1899.

The track between Tanah Abang and Serpong was electrified in 1991 and completed in 1992. In 2009, railway track between Serpong and Parungpanjang has been fully electrified. Tanah Abang–Parungpanjang was the original route of Green Line when it began operation in 2011. Green Line was extended to Maja in 2013. Further extension to Rangkasbitung is operational by 1 April 2017. And the future extension to Serang and Merak in 2021 and elongation platform for 12 cars formation in this 2020.

On 2021 Timetable which took effect in February 2021, all trains starting/ending at Maja station were moved to Tigaraksa station, due to more tracks available at Tigaraksa for idle trains.

Stations 
The distance table of Commuterline stations.

Incidents and accidents
 9 December 2013 – A former Tokyo Metro 7000 series trainset (no. 7121F) travelling as KA 1131 on this line collided with Pertamina tanker truck at Bintaro Permai railway intersection, Jakarta. Seven people (including the three train drivers) were killed in the crash. The trainset was subsequently written-off

Pre-2011 route and services reform 

 18 November 2003, KRL Holec trainset KL2-94202F running KA 396 (Business) on Tanah Abang-Serpong sector of this line caught fire before reaching Kebayoran station, subsequently destroying two frontmost cars of the train. One passenger was killed in this incident.

References

External links 
 KRL Jabotabek website 
 Jabotabek Railnews 
 KRL Jabodetabek 
 KRL-Mania – KRL Jabotabek community site 

Tanah
Infrastructure in Indonesia
Transport in Jakarta
Transport in West Java
Transport in Banten